Richard Louw is a South African rugby league footballer who represented his country in the 2000 World Cup.

Louw later played for the London Skolars in Championship 1 and the Challenge Cup in 2007 and 2008.

References

Living people
South African rugby league players
South Africa national rugby league team players
London Skolars players
Rugby league props
South African expatriate rugby league players
Expatriate rugby league players in England
South African expatriate sportspeople in England
Year of birth missing (living people)